D minor is a minor scale based on D, consisting of the pitches D, E, F, G, A, B, and C. Its key signature has one flat. Its relative major is F major and its parallel major is D major.

The D natural minor scale is:

Changes needed for the melodic and harmonic versions of the scale are written in with accidentals as necessary. The D harmonic minor and melodic minor scales are:

Music in D minor
Of Domenico Scarlatti's 555 keyboard sonatas, 151 are in minor keys, and with 32 sonatas, D minor is the most often chosen minor key.

The Art of Fugue by Johann Sebastian Bach is in D minor.

Michael Haydn's only minor-key symphony, No. 29, is in D minor.

According to Alfred Einstein, the history of tuning has led D minor to be associated with counterpoint and chromaticism (for example, the chromatic fourth), and cites Bach's Chromatic Fantasia and Fugue in D minor. Mozart's Requiem is written primarily in D minor, as are the famous Queen of the Night Aria, "Der Hölle Rache", the ouverture and the final scene of Don Giovanni. Of the two piano concertos that Mozart wrote in a minor key, one of them is in D minor: Piano Concerto No. 20, K. 466. Furthermore, his string quartet no. 13 K173 and string quartet no. 15 K421 (one of the high profile Haydn-quartets) are also in D minor.

The only chamber music compositions in D minor by Ludwig van Beethoven are his stormy Piano Sonata No. 17 and the haunting Largo of the Ghost Trio Op. 70/1. Franz Schubert's Death and the Maiden Quartet is in D minor. A number of Gabriel Fauré's chamber music works are written in D minor, including the Piano Trio Op. 120, the First Piano Quintet Op. 89, and the First Cello Sonata Op. 109. Arnold Schoenberg's Verklärte Nacht is in D minor, as is his String Quartet No. 1.

Since D minor is the key of Beethoven's Symphony No. 9, Anton Bruckner felt apprehensive about writing his own Symphony No. 9 in the same key. As well as Bruckner's First Mass, some other post-Beethoven symphonies are in D minor, including Symphony No. 4 by Robert Schumann, the only Symphony written by César Franck, and Symphony No. 3 by Gustav Mahler.

Jean Sibelius often reserved the key of D minor for compositions he saw as being of a noble character; the Violin Concerto, the Sixth Symphony, and the string quartet Voces intimae are each in the key.

The tonality of D minor held special significance for Helene and Alban Berg.

D minor is particularly recurrent in the music of Sergei Rachmaninoff, with pieces written in the key occupying close to one eighth of his total compositional output, including the Third Piano Concerto, the Piano Sonata No. 1, the Symphony No. 1, the Trio élégiaque No. 2, the Études-Tableaux, Op. 33, No. 4 and Op. 39, No. 8, the Corelli Variations, and the symphonic poem Prince Rostislav.

Works in the classical music era and later beginning in minor typically end in major, or at least on a major chord (such as a picardy third), but there are a few notable examples of works in D minor ending in much sharper keys. Two symphonies that begin in D minor and end in E major are Havergal Brian's Gothic Symphony and Carl Nielsen's Symphony No. 4 (The Inextinguishable). Franz Liszt's Dante Symphony opens in D minor and ends in B major.

Similar to a D minor symphony ending in D major, as with Beethoven's Symphony No. 9, a D major symphony can have for its allegro first movement a slow introduction in D minor. Robbins Landon wrote that "Tonic minor Adagio introductions, especially in the key of D minor, were very popular with English composers of the year 1794", and Joseph Haydn copied this procedure for the D major symphonies he wrote in London.

Film composer Hans Zimmer is one of the most prominent users of the key of D minor in modern times. Many of his well-known scores were written in the key; notable examples are Gladiator, The Dark Knight, Pirates of the Caribbean and The Da Vinci Code. His frequent use of the key has been noticed by reviewers such as Christian Clemmensen of Filmtracks.com, who has called the trend "ridiculous stubbornness".

Notable compositions

 Johann Sebastian Bach
 Toccata and Fugue in D minor, BWV 565
 Chromatic Fantasia and Fugue, BWV 903
 Harpsichord Concerto No. 1, BWV 1052
 Cello Suite No. 2, BWV 1008
 Concerto for Two Violins, BWV 1043
 The Art of Fugue, BWV 1080
 Partita for solo violin No. 2 in D minor, BWV 1004
 Joseph Haydn
 Symphony No. 26 "Lamentatione"
 String Quartet in D minor, Hob.III:76 "Fifths"
 Michael Haydn
 Symphony No. 29
 Wolfgang Amadeus Mozart
 Kyrie in D minor, K 341
 Fantasia in D minor, K 397
 String Quartet No. 15, K 421
 Piano Concerto No. 20, K 466
 Requiem, K 626
 Ludwig van Beethoven
 Piano Sonata No. 17, Op. 31 No. 2 "Tempest"
 Symphony No. 9, Op. 125 "Choral"
 Franz Schubert
 String Quartet No. 14 "Death and the Maiden"
 Felix Mendelssohn
 Piano Concerto No. 2, Op. 40
 Piano Trio No. 1, Op. 49
 Symphony No. 5 "Reformation"
 Frédéric Chopin
 Prelude Op. 28, No. 24 "Storm"
 Polonaise, Op. 71 No. 1
 Charles-Valentin Alkan
 "Le chemin de fer", Op. 27
 "En rythme molossique", No. 2 from 12 études in all the minor keys, Op. 39
 Franz Liszt
 Transcendental Étude No. 4 "Mazeppa", from S. 139
 Mazeppa, S. 100, symphonic poem
 Robert Schumann
 Violin Concerto, WoO 23
 Symphony No. 4, Op. 120
 César Franck
 Symphony in D minor
 Édouard Lalo
 Cello Concerto
 Anton Bruckner
 Symphony in D minor
 Symphony No. 3
 March in D minor
 Mass No. 1
 Symphony No. 9 (unfinished)
 Johannes Brahms
 Piano Concerto No. 1 Op. 15
 Tragic Overture
 Violin Sonata No. 3 Op. 108
 Modest Mussorgsky
 Night on Bald Mountain
 Pyotr Ilyich Tchaikovsky
 Orchestral Suite No. 1 Op. 43
 Antonín Dvořák
 Symphony No. 4 Op. 13, B. 41
 Symphony No. 7 Op. 70, B. 141
 Gabriel Fauré
 Requiem (Fauré) Op. 44
 Gustav Mahler
 Symphony No. 3
 Jean Sibelius
 Violin Concerto Op. 47
 String Quartet, Voces intimae, Op. 56
 Symphony No. 6 Op. 104
 Ralph Vaughan Williams
 Symphony No. 8
 Sergei Rachmaninoff
 Symphony No. 1 Op. 13
 Piano Sonata No. 1 Op. 28
 Piano Concerto No. 3 Op. 30
 Sergei Prokofiev
 Symphony No. 2 Op. 40
 Piano Sonata No. 2 Op. 14
 Dmitri Shostakovich
 Cello Sonata Op. 40
 Symphony No. 5 Op. 47

See also 
 Chord (music)
 Chord notation
 Key (music)
 Major and minor

Notes

External links 
 

Minor scales
Musical keys